Spencer Ludwig (born 24 June 1990) is an American trumpeter, singer, songwriter, producer and musical director from Los Angeles, California. Ludwig is the trumpet player of the band Capital Cities. He recorded on their platinum debut album In a Tidal Wave of Mystery and toured with them from 2011 to 2015. He has also performed with Harry Styles, Dua Lipa, Gallant, Mike Posner, Foster the People, Portugal. The Man, Fitz and the Tantrums, RAC, Joywave, St. Lucia, Cherub, and The Wailers. In 2018 he began his career as an independent artist and formed Trumpet Records.

Early life and education
Ludwig is the son of a Filipino mother and a Russian-Jewish father. He grew up in Los Angeles, California. He attended Oakwood School and began playing saxophone in the fourth grade due to his school's support for performing arts. Ludwig grew fond of jazz music and performed in the school's jazz band during his middle school years.

Ludwig learned to play the French horn in high school but decided to apply to college as a trumpet player. He started off by teaching himself how to play the trumpet going into his senior year of high school. He was accepted to California Institute of the Arts where he studied jazz. He supported his way through school by playing with local bands from Los Angeles and teaching trumpet part-time at his former high school.

Career

Ludwig was part of the local Los Angeles music scene, performing with numerous bands.[1] He began performing while in college, forming a cover band with friends that graduated from Oakwood School a few years before him.[2] It was in 2011 that Ludwig got his break with Capital Cities.[2]

While playing at a local music festival with a band called Sister Rogers in 2011, Capital Cities band members Ryan Merchant and Sebu Simonian watched him perform, later asking him to join the group as its trumpet player.[1][2] Ludwig shifted his focus to solely playing with the band and recorded and toured with them for the next four years.[1] He recorded trumpet on the group's platinum debut album In a Tidal Wave of Mystery.[3]

In 2015 Ludwig signed a record deal with Warner Bros. Records as a solo artist.[4] In July 2016 he released his first two singles Diggy and Right Into U.[7] The song "Diggy" was featured in Target's fall style TV campaign, which premiered on September 14, 2016.[8] "Diggy" also appeared in the feature film "Happy Death Day" and the video game Just Dance 2018. In 2018 Ludwig left Warner Bros. Records to pursue a career as an independent artist and to form his own record label Trumpet Records. In March 2018 he released his first single as an independent artist "Just Wanna Dance" and he collaborated with five-time Latin Grammy winner Fonseca on his song "Por Pura Curiosidad", which was featured on his album Agustín and earned a Latin Grammy in 2019 for Best Traditional Pop Vocal Album.

In 2017 in front of 46,556 fans, he performed the national anthem on trumpet at the 2017 NHL Winter Classic at Busch Stadium in St. Louis, Missouri featuring the Chicago Blackhawks and St. Louis Blues (a first for the Winter Classic). That same year he became the official band leader and musical director for the annual NFL Honors Awards and in 2021 he became the musical director for the ESPY Awards.

Discography

Solo Releases

Songwriting, recording and production credits

References

External links
 Official website of Spencer Ludwig
TV Spot, "Vibes, Target Style"

 

Living people
American trumpeters
American male trumpeters
California Institute of the Arts alumni
Musicians from Los Angeles
Warner Records artists
1990 births
21st-century trumpeters
21st-century American male musicians